Steven Levenson (born May 1984) is an American playwright and television writer. He won the 2017 Tony Award for Best Book of a Musical for Dear Evan Hansen.

Early life
Levenson was raised in Bethesda, Maryland. He was raised in a Reform Jewish family. He attended St. Andrew's Episcopal School and Brown University. He originally studied theater and English but then turned to playwriting.
In discussing his interests in writing, he said: "...it does seem that a lot of my work tends to move in that [family] direction. I do find the dynamics in the family to be fascinating and endlessly variable. Family is, obviously, among the most universal experiences." Although he writes for television as well as the stage, he said: "Theater will always be my first love."

Career

Stage
Levenson wrote the book for the musical Dear Evan Hansen which opened on Broadway in December 2016, after premiering at the Arena Stage in Washington, DC in 2015.

His stage playwriting credits include The Language of Trees (2008, Roundabout Theatre Company Black Box Theatre) and Seven Minutes in Heaven (2009).

The Unavoidable Disappearance of Tom Durnin was produced Off-Broadway by the Roundabout Theatre Company at the Laura Pels Theatre, opening in June 2013. The play was produced under the Roundabout Theatre's New Play Initiative.

His play If I Forget opened Off-Broadway at the Laura Pels Theatre on February 22, 2017 and closed on April 30, 2017. Directed by Daniel Sullivan the cast featured Jeremy Shamos, Kate Walsh and Maria Dizzia.

His play Days of Rage opened at the Off-Broadway Second Stage Theater's Tony Kiser Theatre on October 2, 2018 with direction by Trip Cullman. The play concerns activists in the late 1960s. Days of Rage was earlier presented at the Hartford Stage Brand New Play Festival in a reading in November 2011, directed by Darko Tresnjak.

Television
He was a writer for the Showtime series Masters of Sex, which ran for four seasons, from 2013 to 2016.

He served as showrunner for the FX biographical miniseries Fosse/Verdon about the lives of director-choreographer Bob Fosse and actor-singer Gwen Verdon. The series premiered in 2019.

Film

Personal life
Levenson is married to Whitney May, who has worked in art history and design history. They have a daughter, born in 2015.

Awards and nominations

References

External links

1984 births
21st-century American dramatists and playwrights
21st-century American male writers
American male dramatists and playwrights
American musical theatre librettists
American television writers
Brown University alumni
Jewish American writers
Living people
American male television writers
People from Bethesda, Maryland
Tony Award winners
Writers from Maryland
21st-century American screenwriters
21st-century American Jews